Food security speaks to the availability of food in a country (or geography) and the ability of individuals within that country (geography) to access, afford, and source adequate foodstuffs. According to the United Nations Committee on World Food Security, food security is defined as meaning that all people, at all times, have physical, social, and economic access to sufficient, safe, and nutritious food that meets their food preferences and dietary needs for an active and healthy life. The availability of food irrespective of class, gender or region is another element of food security. There is evidence of food security being a concern many thousands of years ago, with central authorities in ancient China and ancient Egypt being known to release food from storage in times of famine. At the 1974 World Food Conference, the term "food security" was defined with an emphasis on supply; food security is defined as the "availability at all times of adequate, nourishing, diverse, balanced and moderate world food supplies of basic foodstuffs to sustain a steady expansion of food consumption and to offset fluctuations in production and prices". Later definitions added demand and access issues to the definition. The first World Food Summit, held in 1996, stated that food security "exists when all people, at all times, have physical and economic access to sufficient, safe and nutritious food to meet their dietary needs and food preferences for an active and healthy life."

Similarly, household food security is considered to exist when all members, at all times, have access to enough food for an active, healthy life. Individuals who are food secure do not live in hunger or fear of starvation. Food insecurity, on the other hand, is defined by the United States Department of Agriculture (USDA) as a situation of "limited or uncertain availability of nutritionally adequate and safe foods or limited or uncertain ability to acquire acceptable foods in socially acceptable ways". Food security incorporates a measure of resilience to future disruption or unavailability of critical food supply due to various risk factors including droughts, shipping disruptions, fuel shortages, economic instability, and wars.

The Food and Agriculture Organization of the United Nations, or FAO, identified the four pillars of food security as availability, access, utilization, and stability. The United Nations (UN) recognized the Right to Food in the Declaration of Human Rights in 1948, and has since said that it is vital for the enjoyment of all other rights.

The concept of food security has evolved to recognize the centrality of agency and sustainability, along with the four other dimensions of availability, access, utilization, and stability. These six dimensions of food security are reinforced in conceptual and legal understandings of the right to food.

The 1996 World Summit on Food Security declared that "food should not be used as an instrument for political and economic pressure". Multiple different international agreements and mechanisms have been developed to address food security. The main global policy to reduce hunger and poverty is in the Sustainable Development Goals. In particular Goal 2: Zero Hunger sets globally agreed targets to end hunger, achieve food security and improved nutrition, and promote sustainable agriculture by 2030.

The International Monetary Fund cautioned in September 2022 that "the impact of increasing import costs for food and fertilizer for those extremely vulnerable to food insecurity will add $9 billion to their balance of payments pressures - in 2022 and 2023." This would deplete countries' foreign reserves as well as their capacity to pay for food and fertilizer imports."

Measurement
Food security can be measured by calories to digest out to intake per person per day, available on a household budget. In general, the objective of food security indicators and measurements is to capture some or all of the main components of food security in terms of food availability, accessibility, and utilization/adequacy. While availability (production and supply) and utilization/adequacy (nutritional status/anthropometric measurement) are easier to estimate and therefore, more popular, accessibility (the ability to acquire a sufficient quantity and quality of food) remains largely elusive. The factors influencing household food accessibility are often context-specific.

Several measurements have been developed to capture the access component of food security, with some notable examples developed by the USAID-funded Food and Nutrition Technical Assistance (FANTA) project, collaborating with Cornell and Tufts University and Africare and World Vision. These include:
 Household Food Insecurity Access Scale – measures the degree of food insecurity (inaccessibility) in the household in the previous month on a discrete ordinal scale.
 Household Dietary Diversity Scale – measures the number of different food groups consumed over a specific reference period (24hrs/48hrs/7days).
 Household Hunger Scale - measures the experience of household food deprivation based on a set of predictable reactions, captured through a survey and summarized in a scale.
 Coping Strategies Index (CSI) – assesses household behaviors and rates them based on a set of varied established behaviors on how households cope with food shortages. The methodology for this research is based on collecting data on a single question: "What do you do when you do not have enough food, and do not have enough money to buy food?"

Food insecurity is measured in the United States by questions in the Census Bureau's Current Population Survey. The questions asked are about anxiety that the household budget is inadequate to buy enough food, inadequacy in the quantity or quality of food eaten by adults and children in the household, and instances of reduced food intake or consequences of reduced food intake for adults and children. A National Academy of Sciences study commissioned by the USDA criticized this measurement and the relationship of "food security" to hunger, adding "it is not clear whether hunger is appropriately identified as the end of the food security scale."

Recently, FAO has developed the Food Insecurity Experience Scale (FIES) as a universally applicable experience-based food security measurement scale derived from the scale used in the United States. Thanks to the establishment of a global reference scale and the procedure needed to calibrate measures obtained in different countries, it is possible to use the FIES to produce cross-country comparable estimates of the prevalence of food insecurity in the population. Since 2015, the FIES has been adopted as the basis to compile one of the indicators included in the Sustainable Development Goals (SDG) monitoring framework.

The Food and Agriculture Organization of the United Nations (FAO), the World Food Programme (WFP), the International Fund for Agricultural Development (IFAD), the World Health Organization (WHO), and the United Nations Children's Fund (UNICEF) collaborate every year to produce The State of Food Security and Nutrition in the World, or SOFI report (known as The State of Food Insecurity in the World until 2015).

The SOFI report measures chronic hunger (or undernourishment) using two main indicators, the Number of undernourished (NoU) and the Prevalence of undernourishment (PoU). Beginning in the early 2010s, FAO incorporated more complex metrics into its calculations, including estimates of food losses in retail distribution for each country and the volatility in agri-food systems. Since 2016, it also reports the Prevalence of moderate or severe food insecurity based on the FIES.

Recent editions of the SOFI report present evidence that the decades-long decline in hunger in the world, as measured by the number of undernourished (NoU), has ended. In the 2020 report, FAO used newly accessible data from China to revise the global NoU downwards to nearly 690 million, or 8.9 percent of the world population – but having recalculated the historic hunger series accordingly, it confirmed that the number of hungry people in the world, albeit lower than previously thought, had been slowly increasing since 2014. On broader measures, the SOFI report found that far more people suffered some form of food insecurity, with 3 billion or more unable to afford even the cheapest healthy diet.  Nearly 2.37 billion people did not have access to adequate food in 2020 – an increase of 320 million people compared to 2019. FAO's 2021 edition of The State of Food and Agriculture (SOFA) further estimates that an additional 1 billion people (mostly in lower- and upper-middle-income countries) are at risk of not affording a healthy diet if a shock were to reduce their income by a third.

Rates

The 2021 edition of the SOFI report estimated the hunger excess linked to the COVID-19 pandemic at 30 million people by the end of the decade  – FAO had earlier warned that even without the pandemic, the world was off track to achieve Zero Hunger or Goal 2 of the Sustainable Development Goals – it further found that already in the first year of the pandemic, the prevalence of undernourishment (PoU) had increased 1.5 percentage points, reaching a level of around 9.9 percent. This is the mid-point of an estimate of 720 to 811 million people facing hunger in 2020 – as many as 161 million more than in 2019. The number had jumped by some 446 million in Africa, 57 million in Asia, and about 14 million in Latin America and the Caribbean.

At the global level, the prevalence of food insecurity at a moderate or severe levels, and severe level only, is higher among women than men, magnified in rural areas. The gender gap in accessing food increased from 2018 to 2019, particularly at the moderate or severe levels. Today, more than one billion women and girls around the world still do not have access to the healthy diets they need to survive and thrive, and two-thirds of countries report higher rates of food insecurity for women than men, especially in the Near East area.

Examples of food insecurity

Famines have been frequent in world history. Some have killed millions and substantially diminished the population of a large area. The most common causes have been drought and war, but the greatest famines in history were caused by economic policy. One economic policy example of famine was the Holodomor (Great Famine) induced by the Soviet Union's communist economic policy resulting in 7-10 million deaths.

Close to 12 percent of the global population was severely food insecure in 2020, representing 928 million people – 148 million more than in 2019. A variety of reasons lies behind the increase in hunger over the past few years. Slowdowns and downturns since the 2008-9 financial crisis have conspired to degrade social conditions, making undernourishment more prevalent. Structural imbalances and a lack of inclusive policies have combined with extreme weather events; altered environmental conditions; and the spread of pests and diseases, such as the COVID-19 pandemic, triggering stubborn cycles of poverty and hunger. In 2019, the high cost of healthy diets together with persistently high levels of income inequality put healthy diets out of reach for around 3 billion people, especially the poor, in every region of the world.

Inequality in the distributions of assets, resources, and income, compounded by the absence or scarcity of welfare provisions in the poorest countries, is further undermining access to food. Nearly a tenth of the world population still lives on US$1.90 or less a day, with sub-Saharan Africa and southern Asia the regions most affected.

High import and export dependence ratios are meanwhile making many countries more vulnerable to external shocks. In many low-income economies, debt has swollen to levels far exceeding GDP, eroding growth prospects.

Finally, there are increasing risks to institutional stability, persistent violence, and large-scale population relocation as a consequence of the conflicts. With the majority of them being hosted in developing nations, the number of displaced individuals between 2010 and 2018 increased by 70% between 2010 and 2018 to reach 70.8 million.

Food security by country

Afghanistan
In Afghanistan, about 35.5% of households are food insecure.  The prevalence of underweight, stunting, and wasting in children under five years of age is also very high.

Western countries suspended humanitarian aid to Afghanistan following the Taliban's takeover of the country in August 2021. The United States has frozen about $9 billion in assets belonging to the Afghan central bank, blocking the Taliban from accessing billions of dollars held in U.S. bank accounts. In October 2021, more than half of Afghanistan's 39 million people faced an acute food shortage. On 11 November 2021, Human Rights Watch reported that Afghanistan is facing widespread famine due to collapsed economy and broken banking system. The UN World Food Program has also issued multiple warnings of worsening food insecurity.

China
Food security is a policy  priority of the government of China.

The persistence of wet markets has been described as "critical for ensuring urban food security", particularly in Chinese cities. The influence of wet markets on urban food security includes food pricing and physical accessibility.

Calling food waste "shameful", General Secretary of the Chinese Communist Party Xi Jinping launched "Operation empty plate". Xi stressed that there should be a sense of crisis regarding food security. In 2020, China witnessed a rise in food prices, due to the COVID-19 outbreak and mass flooding that wiped out the country's crops, which made food security a priority for Xi.

Mexico

Food insecurity has been an issue for Mexico throughout its history. Although food availability is not the issue, severe deficiencies in the accessibility of food contribute to insecurity. Between 2003 and 2005, the total Mexican food supply was well above the level sufficient to meet the requirement of the Mexican population, averaging 3,270 kilocalories per daily capita, which is higher than the minimum requirements of 1,850 kilocalories per daily capita. However, at least 10 percent of the population in every Mexican state suffers from inadequate food access. In nine states, 25–35 percent live in food-insecure households. More than 10 percent of the population of seven Mexican states falls into the category of Serious Food Insecurity.

The issue of food inaccessibility is magnified by chronic child malnutrition, as well as obesity in children, adolescents, and families.

Mexico is vulnerable to drought, which can cripple agriculture.

Singapore
In 1965 Singapore produced 60% of its vegetable demand, 80% of its poultry, and 100% of its eggs. In 2019 Singapore produced 13% of all leafy vegetables consumed, 24% of its eggs, and 9% of its fish. In that year the government launched the "30 by 30" program which aims to drastically reduce food insecurity through hydroponic farms and aquaculture farms.

United States

The Department of Agriculture defines food insecurity as "limited or uncertain availability of nutritionally adequate and safe foods or limited or uncertain ability to acquire acceptable foods in socially acceptable ways." Food security is defined by the USDA as "access by all people at all times to enough food for an active, healthy life."

National Food Security Surveys are the main survey tool used by the USDA to measure food security in the United States. Based on respondents' answers to survey questions, the household can be placed on a continuum of food security defined by the USDA. This continuum has four categories: high food security, marginal food security, low food security, and very low food security. The continuum of food security ranges from households that consistently have access to nutritious food to households where at least one or more members routinely go without food due to economic reasons. Economic Research Service report number 155 (ERS-155) estimates that 14.5 percent (17.6 million) of US households were food insecure at some point in 2012.

Across 2016, 2017 and 2018:
 11.1 percent (14.3 million) of U.S. households were food insecure at some time during 2018.
 In 6.8 percent of households with children, only adults were food insecure in 2018.
 Both children and adults were food insecure in 7.1 percent of households with children (2.7 million households) in 2018.
 11.8 percent (15.0 million) of U.S. households were food insecure at some time during 2017.
 7.4 percent (9.4 million) of U.S. households had low food security in 2016.
 4.9 percent (6.1 million) of U.S. households had very low food security at some time during 2016.
 Both children and adults were food insecure in 8.0 percent of households with children (3.1 million households).

Food insecurity is recognized as a social determinant of health, or a condition in the environment where people are born, live, learn, work, play, worship, and age that affect a wide range of health, functioning, and quality-of-life outcomes and risks. The severity of food insecurity differs between populations and communities such as minority populations and rural communities. People who experience food insecurity are usually faced with a variety of other socioeconomic and personal challenges such as affordable housing issues, social isolation, economic/social disadvantage resulting from structural racism, chronic or acute health problems, high medical costs, and low wages, all of which compound the problem. Poverty is closely associated with food insecurity but this relationship is not foolproof, in that not all people living below the poverty line experience food insecurity, and people who live above the poverty line can also experience food insecurity. In recognition of the complexity of the issue of food insecurity, promising and viable solutions consist of ones that frame food insecurity as a social issue and are comprehensive in that they address the interplay between food insecurity and socioeconomic and systemic factors, not merely the issue of fresh food access and availability. One example may include making efforts to increase minimum wage or unemployment rates in affected areas, in addition to addressing a community's access to fresh food. An effort being increasing the implementation of social protection programs that function to stablize incomes, raising incomes, or enhancing social justice, since underlying factors of food insecurity relates to economic factors such as income.

In September 2022, the United States announced a $2.9 billion contribution to aid efforts of global food security at the UN General Assembly in New York. $2 billion will go to the U.S. Agency for International Development for its humanitarian assistance efforts around the world, along with $140 million for the agency’s Feed the Future Initiative. The United States Department of Agriculture will receive $220 million to fund eight new projects, all of which is expected to benefit nearly a million children residing in food-insecure countries in Africa and East Asia. The USDA will also receive another $178 million for seven international development projects to support U.S. government priorities on four continents.

Feed the Future
In 2010, the government of the United States began the Feed the Future Initiative. The initiative is expected to work based on country-led priorities that call for consistent support by the governments, donor organizations, the private sector, and civil society to accomplish its long-term goals.

Uganda
In 2022 28% of Ugandan households experienced food insecurity. This insecurity has negative effects on HIV transmission and household stability.

Democratic Republic of Congo
The Democratic Republic of Congo is the second-largest country in Africa and is dealing with food insecurity. Although they have an abundance of natural resources, they lack accessibility to essential foods, which makes it difficult for the Congolese people in their daily lives. Malnutrition is high among children, which affects their ability, and children who live in rural areas are affected more than children who live in urban areas. In the Democratic Republic of Congo, about 33% of households are food insecure; it is 60% in eastern provinces.  A study showed the correlation of food insecurity negatively affecting at-risk HIV adults in the Democratic Republic of Congo.

In 2007–2008, grain prices increased and the people in the Democratic Republic of the Congo went into civil unrest. There were riots and protests. Hunger is frequent in the country, but sometimes it is to the extreme that many families cannot afford to eat every day. Bushmeat trade was used to measure the trend of food security. The trend signifies the amount of consumption in urban and rural areas. Urban areas mainly consume bushmeat because they cannot afford other types of meat.

Australia 
Agriculture remains one of Australia's main exports, particularly beef, wheat,and rice. Australia is estimated to export enough food to feed 40 million people. Conversely, Australia is estimated to retain enough food to feed roughly 22 million domestically. Australia's main agricultural exports are to countries such as Japan, Indonesia, and South Korea.

In 2012, the Australian Bureau of Statistics (ABS) conducted a survey measuring nutrition, which included food security. Financial issues were cited as the main cause of food insecurity. It was reported that 4% of Australian households were food insecure. 1.5% of those households were severely food insecure. Additionally, the Australian Institute of Family Studies (AIFS), reported that certain demographics are more vulnerable to being food insecure; such as indigenous, elderly, regional, and single-parent households.

Climate change may present future challenges for Australia regarding food security, as Australia already experiences extreme weather. Australia's history in biofuel production and use of fertilizers has reduced the quality of the land. Increased extreme weather is projected to affect crops, livestock, and soil quality. Wheat production, one of Australia's main food exports, is projected to decrease by 9.2% by 2030. Beef production is also expected to fall by 9.6%.

World Summit on Food Security
The World Summit on Food Security, held in Rome in 1996, aimed to renew a global commitment to the fight against hunger. The Food and Agriculture Organization of the United Nations (FAO) called the summit in response to widespread undernutrition and growing concern about the capacity of agriculture to meet future food needs. The conference produced two key documents, the Rome Declaration on World Food Security and the World Food Summit Plan of Action.

The Rome Declaration called for the members of the United Nations to work to halve the number of chronically undernourished people on the Earth by 2015. The Plan of Action set several targets for government and non-governmental organizations for achieving food security, at the individual, household, national, regional, and global levels.

Another World Summit on Food Security took place at the FAO's headquarters in Rome between November 16 and 18, 2009.

Pillars of food security

The WHO states that  three pillars that determine food security: food availability, food access, and food use and misuse. The FAO adds a fourth pillar: the stability of the first three dimensions of food security over time. In 2009, the World Summit on Food Security stated that the "four pillars of food security are availability, access, utilization, and stability".
Two additional pillars of food security were recommended in 2020 by the High-Level Panel of Experts for the Committee on World Food Security: agency and sustainability.

Availability
Food availability relates to the supply of food through production, distribution, and exchange. Food production is determined by a variety of factors including land ownership and use; soil management; crop selection, breeding, and management; livestock breeding and management; and harvesting. Crop production can be affected by changes in rainfall and temperatures. The use of land, water, and energy to grow food often compete with other uses, which can affect food production. Land used for agriculture can be used for urbanization or lost to desertification, salinization, and soil erosion due to unsustainable agricultural practices. Crop production is not required for a country to achieve food security. Nations do not have to have the natural resources required to produce crops to achieve food security, as seen in the examples of Japan and Singapore.

Because food consumers outnumber producers in every country, food must be distributed to different regions or nations.
Food distribution involves the storage, processing, transport, packaging, and marketing of food. Food-chain infrastructure and storage technologies on farms can also affect the amount of food wasted in the distribution process. Poor transport infrastructure can increase the price of supplying water and fertilizer as well as the price of moving food to national and global markets. Around the world, few individuals or households are continuously self-reliant on food. This creates the need for a bartering, exchange, or cash economy to acquire food. The exchange of food requires efficient trading systems and market institutions, which can affect food security. Per capita world food supplies are more than adequate to provide food security to all, and thus food accessibility is a greater barrier to achieving food security.

Access

Food access refers to the affordability and allocation of food, as well as the preferences of individuals and households. The UN Committee on Economic, Social and Cultural Rights noted that the causes of hunger and malnutrition are often not a scarcity of food but an inability to access available food, usually due to poverty. Poverty can limit access to food, and can also increase how vulnerable an individual or household is to food price spikes. Access depends on whether the household has enough income to purchase food at prevailing prices or has sufficient land and other resources to grow its food. Households with enough resources can overcome unstable harvests and local food shortages and maintain their access to food.

There are two distinct types of access to food: direct access, in which a household produces food using human and material resources, and economic access, in which a household purchases food produced elsewhere. Location can affect access to food and which type of access a family will rely on. The assets of a household, including income, land, products of labor, inheritances, and gifts can determine a household's access to food. However, the ability to access sufficient food may not lead to the purchase of food over other materials and services. Demographics and education levels of members of the household as well as the gender of the household head determine the preferences of the household, which influences the type of food that is purchased. A household's access to enough nutritious food may not assure adequate food intake for all household members, as intrahousehold food allocation may not sufficiently meet the requirements of each member of the household. The USDA adds that access to food must be available in socially acceptable ways, without, for example, resorting to emergency food supplies, scavenging, stealing, or other coping strategies.

Socially transmitted stereotypes and beliefs about certain groups can lead to discrimination and potentially to marginalization, resulting in exclusion from social and economic life. For example, when individuals cannot participate in the cultural norms in their community, such as having access to food to celebrate religious or cultural holidays due to exclusion from society, it can increase their chance of being food insecure. Specifically, their social and psychological well-being will not be fulfilled. In particular, indigenous peoples are at a higher risk of food insecurity due to exclusion, evidenced by the higher rates of stunting in indigenous communities (e.g. Guatemala) compared to non-indigenous communities. This can also be attributed to the inability to protect access to traditional foods and bio-cultural resources that form the basis of their diet.

Culture shapes eating and meal patterns, and can determine ingrained rituals such as when and how a meal is eaten and prepared. Resettled refugees, for example, can face difficulties assimilating to the new cultural ways of eating and navigating the new food environment, placing them at a higher risk of food insecurity despite having physical access to food.

Utilization
The next pillar of food security is food utilization, which refers to the metabolism of food by individuals. Once the food is obtained by a household, a variety of factors affect the quantity and quality of food that reaches members of the household. To achieve food security, the food ingested must be safe and must be enough to meet the physiological requirements of each individual. Food safety affects food utilization, and can be affected by the preparation, processing, and cooking of food in the community and household. How we prepare food is largely influenced by our culture. Traditional food processing can greatly affect food utilization and influence present-day food preparation. Techniques such as fermenting, germination, and soaking can improve the nutritional value and safety of food while being cost and energy efficient. Exploring the benefits of traditional techniques and how different cultures utilize food can allow for a deeper understanding of food processing, preparation, and storage of food and increase overall food security. Nutritional values of the household determine food choice, and whether food meets cultural preferences is important to utilization in terms of psychological and social well-being. Access to healthcare is another determinant of food utilization since the health of individuals controls how the food is metabolized. For example, intestinal parasites can take nutrients from the body and decrease food utilization. Sanitation can also decrease the occurrence and spread of diseases that can affect food utilization. Education about nutrition and food preparation can affect food utilization and improve this pillar of food security.

Stability
Food stability refers to the ability to obtain food over time. Food insecurity can be transitory, seasonal, or chronic. In transitory food insecurity, food may be unavailable during certain periods of time. At the food production level, natural disasters and drought result in crop failure and decreased food availability. Civil conflicts can also decrease access to food. Instability in markets resulting in food-price spikes can cause transitory food insecurity. Other factors that can temporarily cause food insecurity are loss of employment or productivity, which can be caused by illness. Seasonal food insecurity can result from the regular pattern of growing seasons in food production.

Chronic (or permanent) food insecurity is defined as the long-term, persistent lack of adequate food. In this case, households are constantly at risk of being unable to acquire food to meet the needs of all members.
Chronic and transitory food insecurity are linked since the reoccurrence of transitory food security can make households more vulnerable to chronic food insecurity.

Agency
Agency refers to the capacity of individuals or groups to make their own decisions about what foods they eat, what foods they produce, how that food is produced, processed, and distributed within food systems, and their ability to engage in processes that shape food system policies and governance.

Sustainability
Sustainability refers to the long-term ability of food systems to provide food security and nutrition in a way that does not compromise the economic, social, and environmental bases that generate food security and nutrition for future generations.

Effects of food insecurity
Famine and hunger are both rooted in food insecurity. Chronic food insecurity translates into a high degree of vulnerability to famine and hunger; ensuring food security presupposes the elimination of that vulnerability. Data shows that food insecurity has detrimental effects on a human's well-being. Such effects include chronic and infectious diseases, especially diabetes, and HIV/AIDS, nutritional status and mental health. Social and ecological factors must also be considered especially taking sociocultural implications into account as those are related to child growth, diseases, and the nutritional status of an individual.

The coping of households is dependent on contextual factors, such as where an individual is settled, namely rural, urban or marginal environments. The ways households respond to food insecurity influences health aspects such as infectious and chronic diseases, nutritional status, and mental health. It is essential for households to develop a sufficient coping strategy in to combat the negative impact food insecurity has on an individual's well-being. Households experiencing food insecurity tend to have a greater number of coping strategies than households with water insecurity. Even though there is a pattern of universal coping responses, it is important to consider contextual factors, for instance, the geographical and social setting.

Biological anthropologists are thought to be essential for the contribution and understanding of the relationship between food insecurity and human health. They are interested in research and policy to improve food security in populations around the world. By improving food insecurity, better food safety is promoted.

The Russian invasion of Ukraine has disrupted global food supplies  which had already been hit hard by the disruption caused by the COVID-19 pandemic and the growing impact of climate change. The conflict has severely impacted food supply chains with noteworthy effects on production, sourcing, manufacturing, processing, logistics, and significant shifts in demand between nations reliant on imports from Ukraine. In Asia and the Pacific, many of the region's countries depend on the importation of basic food staples such as wheat and fertilizer with nearly 1.1 billion lacking a healthy diet caused by poverty and ever-increasing food prices. On September 27, 2022, the Asian Development Bank announced a plan for a comprehensive range of assistance totaling $14 billion for both immediate and longer-term actions. The plan calls to improve long-term food security by strengthening farming and food supplies to cope with climate change and the loss of biodiversity in Asia and the Pacific. Since 2018, ADB has identified food security as a key operational priority. Under the program, assistance will start in 2022 and continue through 2025.

Food insecurity can force individuals to undertake risky economic activities such as prostitution. A report from ICAP at Columbia University found that "Women and girls experiencing food insecurity were 28% more likely to engage in transactional sex, defined as sex in exchange for material goods, including food. They are also more likely to engage in high-risk or unprotected sex, sex before the age of 15, forced sex, or sex with a man who is 10 or more years older." This increases the risk of contracting HIV.

Stunting and chronic nutritional deficiencies

Many countries experience ongoing food shortages and distribution problems. These result in chronic and often widespread hunger amongst significant numbers of people. Human populations can respond to chronic hunger and malnutrition by decreasing body size, known in medical terms as stunting or stunted growth. This process starts in utero if the mother is malnourished and continues through approximately the third year of life. It leads to higher infant and child mortality, but at rates far lower than during famines. Once stunting has occurred, improved nutritional intake after the age of about two years is unable to reverse the damage. Stunting itself can be viewed as a coping mechanism, bringing body size into alignment with the calories available during adulthood in the location where the child is born. Limiting body size as a way of adapting to low levels of energy (calories) adversely affects health in three ways:
 Premature failure of vital organs during adulthood. For example, a 50-year-old individual might die of heart failure because his/her heart suffered structural defects during early development;
 Stunted individuals suffer a higher rate of disease and illness than those who have not undergone stunting;
 Severe malnutrition in early childhood often leads to defects in cognitive development. It, therefore, creates a disparity a between children who did not experience severe malnutrition and those who experience it.
Between 2000 and 2019, the global prevalence of child stunting declined by one-third.

Worldwide, the prevalence of child stunting was 21.3 percent in 2019, or 144 million children. Central Asia, Eastern Asia, and the Caribbean have the largest rates of reduction in the prevalence of stunting and are the only subregions on track to achieve the 2025 and 2030 stunting targets.

Data from the 2021 FAO SOFI showed that in 2020, 22.0 percent (149.2 million) of children under 5 years of age were affected by stunting, 6.7 percent (45.4 million) were suffering from wasting and 5.7 percent (38.9 million) were overweight. FAO warned that the figures could be even higher due to the effects of the COVID-19 pandemic.

Africa and Asia account for more than nine out of ten of all children with stunting, more than nine out of ten children with wasting, and more than seven out of ten children who are affected by being overweight worldwide.

The 2020 edition of FAO's Near East and North Africa − Regional Overview of Food Security and Nutrition found that in 2019 22.5 percent of children under the age of five were stunted, 9.2 percent were wasted, and 9.9 percent were overweight across several Arab and North African countries.

Although there has been some progress, the world is not on track to achieve the global nutrition targets, including those on child stunting, wasting and overweight by 2030.

Depression, anxiety, and sleep disorders
A recent comprehensive systematic review showed that over 50 studies have shown that food insecurity is strongly associated with a higher risk of depression, anxiety, and sleep disorders. For depression and anxiety, food-insecure individuals have almost a threefold risk increase compared to food-secure individuals.

Challenges to achieving food security

Global water crisis

Water deficits, which are already spurring heavy grain imports in numerous smaller countries, may soon do the same in larger countries, such as China or India. The water tables are falling in scores of countries (including northern China, the US, and India) due to widespread overpumping using powerful diesel and electric pumps. Other countries affected include Pakistan, Afghanistan, and Iran. This will eventually lead to water scarcity and cutbacks in grain harvest. Even with the overpumping of its aquifers, China is developing a grain deficit. When this happens, it will almost certainly drive grain prices upward. Most of the 3 billion people projected to be born worldwide by mid-century will be born in countries already experiencing water shortages. After China and India, there is a second tier of smaller countries with large water deficits – Afghanistan, Algeria, Egypt, Iran, Mexico, and Pakistan. Four of these already import a large share of their grain. Only Pakistan remains self-sufficient. But with a population expanding by 4 million a year, it will likely soon turn into the world market for grain.

Regionally, Sub-Saharan Africa has the largest number of water-stressed countries of any place on the globe, as of an estimated 800 million people who live in Africa, 300 million live in a water-stressed environment. It is estimated that by 2030, 75 million to 250 million people in Africa will be living in areas of high water stress, which will likely displace anywhere between 24 million and 700 million people as conditions become increasingly unlivable. Because the majority of Africa remains dependent on an agricultural lifestyle and 80 to 90 percent of all families in rural Africa rely upon producing their food, water scarcity translates to a loss of food security.

Multimillion-dollar investments beginning in the 1990s by the World Bank have reclaimed the desert and turned the Ica Valley in Peru, one of the driest places on earth, into the largest supplier of asparagus in the world. However, the constant irrigation has caused a rapid drop in the water table, in some places as much as eight meters per year, one of the fastest rates of aquifer depletion in the world. The wells of small farmers and local people are beginning to run dry and the water supply for the main city in the valley is under threat. As a cash crop, asparagus has provided jobs for local people, but most of the money goes to the buyers, mainly the British. A 2010 report concluded that the industry is not sustainable and accuses investors, including the World Bank, of failing to take proper responsibility for the effect of their decisions on the water resources of poorer countries. Diverting water from the headwaters of the Ica River to asparagus fields has also led to a water shortage in the mountain region of Huancavelica, where indigenous communities make a marginal living herding.

Land degradation

Several definitions of land degradation exist in literature with varying emphasis on biodiversity, ecosystem functions and services. One definition of land degradation is "a negative trend in the condition of land that is caused by direct or indirect human-induced processes inclusive of anthropogenic climate change which is expressed as a long-term loss or reduction of at least one of the following: biological productivity, ecological integrity or value to humans." This definition applies to the forest and non-forest land and soil degradation. Intensive farming often leads to a vicious cycle of exhaustion of soil fertility and a decline of agricultural yields. Other causes of land degradation include deforestation, overgrazing, over-exploitation of vegetation for use. Approximately 40 percent of the world's agricultural land is seriously degraded. According to UNU's Ghana-based Institute for Natural Resources in Africa, if current trends of soil degradation continue, Africa might be able to feed just 25 percent of its population by 2025.

Climate change

Over the coming decades, a changing climate and environmental stressors will have significant yet uncertain impacts on global food security. Extreme events, such as droughts and floods, are forecast to increase with climate change. Ranging from flash floods to gradually worsening droughts, these will have a range of effects on agriculture as well as the plants that various communities can grow.  According to the Climate & Development Knowledge Network report Managing Climate Extremes and Disasters in the Agriculture Sectors: Lessons from the IPCC SREX Report, the effects will include changing productivity and livelihood patterns, economic losses, and effects on infrastructure, markets and food security. Food security in the future will be linked to our ability to adapt agricultural systems to extreme events.  An example of a shifting weather pattern would be a rise in temperatures.  As temperatures rise due to climate change there is a risk of a diminished food supply due to heat damage. According to recent statistics, the agricultural system produces around 21% to 37% greenhouses, contributing to the climate crisis and leaving a dire situation for food security or malnutrition.

Approximately 2.4 billion people live in the drainage basin of the Himalayan rivers. India, China, Pakistan, Afghanistan, Bangladesh, Nepal and Myanmar could experience floods followed by severe droughts in the coming decades. In India alone, the Ganges provides water for drinking and farming for more than 500 million people. Glaciers are not the only worry that the developing nations have; sea level is reported to rise as climate change progresses, reducing the amount of land available for agriculture.

In other parts of the world, a big effect will be low yields of grain according to the World Food Trade Model, specifically in the low-latitude regions where much of the developing world is located. From this the price of grain will rise, along with the developing nations trying to grow the grain. Due to this, every 2–2.5% price hike will increase the number of hungry people by 1%. Low crop yields are just one of the problems facing farmers in low latitudes and tropical regions. The timing and length of the growing seasons, when farmers plant their crops, are going to be changing dramatically, per the USDA, due to unknown changes in soil temperature and moisture conditions.

Another way of thinking about food security and climate change comes from Evan Fraser, a geographer working at the University of Guelph in Ontario, Canada. His approach is to explore the vulnerability of food systems to climate change and he defines vulnerability to climate change as situations that occur when relatively minor environmental problems cause major effects on food security. Examples of this include the Ethiopian Famine in the early 1980s. Three factors stand out as common in such cases, and these three factors act as a diagnostic "tool kit" through which to identify cases where food security may be vulnerable to climate change. These factors are:
specialized agro-ecosystems; 
households with very few livelihood options other than farming;
situations where formal institutions do not provide adequate safety nets to protect people. 

"The International Food Policy Research Institute (IFPRI) estimates that an additional US$ 7.1–7.3 billion per year are needed in agricultural investments to offset the negative effect of climate change on nutrition for children by 2050."

Agricultural diseases
Diseases affecting livestock or crops can have devastating effects on food availability especially if there are no contingency plans in place.
For example, Ug99, a lineage of wheat stem rust, which can cause up to 100% crop losses, is present in wheat fields in several countries in Africa and the Middle East and is predicted to spread rapidly through these regions and possibly further afield, potentially causing a wheat production disaster that would affect food security worldwide.

The genetic diversity of the crop wild relatives of wheat can be used to improve modern varieties to be more rust resistant. In their centers of origin wild wheat plants are screened for rust resistance, then their genetic information is studied and finally wild plants and modern varieties are crossed through means of modern plant breeding to transfer the resistance genes from the wild plants to the modern varieties.

Food versus fuel

Farmland and other agricultural resources have long been used to produce non-food crops including industrial materials such as cotton, flax, and rubber; drug crops such as tobacco and opium, and biofuels such as firewood, etc. In the 21st century, the production of fuel crops has increased, adding to this diversion. However, technologies are also developed to commercially produce food from energy such as natural gas and electrical energy with tiny water and land footprint.

Politics

Nobel Prize-winning economist Amartya Sen observed that "there is no such thing as an apolitical food problem." While drought and other naturally occurring events may trigger famine conditions, it is government action or inaction that determines its severity, and often even whether or not a famine will occur.  The 20th century has examples of governments, such as Collectivization in the Soviet Union or the Great Leap Forward in the People's Republic of China undermining the food security of their nations.  Mass starvation is frequently a weapon of war, as in the blockade of Germany, the Battle of the Atlantic, and the blockade of Japan during World War I and World War II and in the Hunger Plan enacted by Nazi Germany.

Governments sometimes have a narrow base of support, built upon cronyism and patronage. Fred Cuny pointed out in 1999 that under these conditions: "The distribution of food within a country is a political issue. Governments in most countries give priority to urban areas, since that is where the most influential and powerful families and enterprises are usually located. The government often neglects subsistence farmers and rural areas in general. The more remote and underdeveloped the area the less likely the government will be to effectively meet its needs. Many agrarian policies, especially the pricing of agricultural commodities, discriminate against rural areas. Governments often keep prices of basic grains at such artificially low levels that subsistence producers cannot accumulate enough capital to make investments to improve their production. Thus, they are effectively prevented from getting out of their precarious situation."

In Venezuela, the government has used food as a political weapon, rewarding supporters while denying food supplies to areas that oppose their rule.

A government with a strong tendency towards kleptocracy can undermine food security even when harvests are good. When the rule of law is absent or is non-existent, farmers have little incentive to improve their productivity. If a farm becomes noticeably more productive than neighboring farms, it may become the target of individuals well-connected to the government. Rather than risk being noticed and possibly losing their land, farmers may be content with the perceived safety of mediocrity.

Food loss and waste

Food waste may be diverted for alternative human consumption when economic variables allow for it. In the 2019 edition of the State of Food and Agriculture, FAO asserted that food loss and waste have potential effects on the four pillars of food security. However, the links between food loss and waste reduction and food security are complex, and positive outcomes are not always certain. Reaching acceptable levels of food security and nutrition inevitably implies certain levels of food loss and waste. Maintaining buffers to ensure food stability requires a certain amount of food to be lost or wasted. At the same time, ensuring food safety involves discarding unsafe food, which then is counted as lost or wasted, while higher-quality diets tend to include more highly perishable foods.

How the impacts on the different dimensions of food security play out and affect the food security of different population groups depends on where in the food supply chain the reduction in losses or waste takes place as well as on where nutritionally vulnerable and food-insecure people are located geographically.

The waste of consumable food is even gaining attention from large food conglomerates. For instance, due to low food prices, simply discarding irregular carrots has typically been more cost-effective than spending money on the extra labor or machinery necessary to handle them. A juice factory in the Netherlands, however, has developed a process to efficiently divert and use previously rejected carrots, and its parent company is expanding this innovation to plants in Great Britain.

In recent years, France has worked to combat food insecurity, in part by addressing food waste; since 2013 the country has passed laws prohibiting grocery stores from discarding unsold food items, requiring that they instead donate the food to designated charities. Nevertheless, according to The Economists Global Food Security Index, overall food insecurity remains more severe in France than in the United States despite higher nationwide estimates of food waste in the U.S.

Local efforts can directly help regional food security, particularly when residents become mindful of the juxtaposition of food insecurity in their communities with their own food waste at home. Learning that the average family of four throws away $1,500 worth of food per year while neighbors may be going hungry the motivation to waste less and give more: waste less money at the grocery store and give more to the food pantry.

Overfishing

The overexploitation of fish stocks can pose serious risks to food security. In 2022 the United Nations called attention “considerably negative impact” on food security of the fish oil and fishmeal industries in West Africa.

Risks to food security

Population growth

2017 UN projections show a continued increase in population in the future (but a steady decline in the population growth rate), with the global population expected to reach 9.8 billion in 2050 and 11.2 billion by 2100. Estimates by the UN Population Division for the year 2150 range between 3.2 and 24.8 billion; mathematical modeling supports the lower estimate. Some analysts have questioned the sustainability of further world population growth, highlighting the growing pressures on the environment, global food supplies, and energy resources. Solutions for feeding the extra billions in the future are being studied and documented.

Fossil fuel dependence

While agricultural output has increased, energy consumption to produce a crop has also increased at a greater rate, so the ratio of crops produced to energy input has decreased over time. Green Revolution techniques also heavily rely on chemical fertilizers, pesticides and herbicides, many of which are petroleum products, making agriculture increasingly reliant on petroleum.

Between 1950 and 1984, as the Green Revolution transformed agriculture around the globe, world grain production increased by 250%. The energy for the Green Revolution was provided by fossil fuels in the form of fertilizers (natural gas), pesticides (oil), and hydrocarbon-fueled irrigation.

Natural gas is a major feedstock for the production of ammonia, via the Haber process, for use in fertilizer production. The development of synthetic nitrogen fertilizer has significantly supported global population growth — it has been estimated that almost half the people on Earth are currently fed as a result of synthetic nitrogen fertilizer use. According to ICIS Fertilizers managing editor Julia Meehan, "People don’t realize that 50% of the world’s food relies on fertilizers."

Economic

Price setting

In 2008, Thailand, one of the world's bihast rice exporters, announced the creation of the Organisation of Rice Exporting Countries with the potential to develop into a price-fixing cartel for rice. It is a project to organize 21 rice exporting countries to create a homonymous organisation to control the price of rice. The group is mainly made up of Thailand, Vietnam, Cambodia, Laos and Myanmar. The organization attempts to serve the purpose of making a "contribution to ensuring food stability, not just in an individual country but also to address food shortages in the region and the world". However, it is still questionable whether this organization will serve its role as an effective rice price fixing cartel, that is similar to OPEC's mechanism for managing petroleum. Economic analysts and traders said the proposal would go nowhere because of the inability of governments to cooperate with each other and control farmers' output. Moreover, countries that are involved expressed their concern that this could only worsen the food security.

Inflation
Inflation can jeopardize food security and decrease the effectiveness of measures meant to achieve it.

Land use change
China needs not less than 120 million hectares of arable land for its food security. China has reported a surplus of 15 million hectares. By contrast, some 4 million hectares of conversion to urban use and 3 million hectares of contaminated land have also been reported. A 2014 survey found that 2.5% of China's arable land is too contaminated to grow food without harm.

Global catastrophic risks

As anthropogenic greenhouse gas emissions reduce the stability of the global climate, abrupt climate change could become more intense. The impact of an asteroid or comet larger than about 1 km diameter has the potential to block the sun globally, causing impact winter. Particles in the troposphere would quickly rain out, but particles in the stratosphere, especially sulfate, could remain there for years. Similarly, a supervolcanic eruption would reduce the potential of agricultural production from solar photosynthesis, causing volcanic winter. The Toba super volcanic eruption approximately 70,000 years ago may have nearly caused the extinction of humans (see Toba catastrophe theory). Again, primarily sulfate particles could block the sun for years. Solar blocking is not limited to natural causes as nuclear winter is also possible, which refers to the scenario involving widespread nuclear war and burning of cities that release soot into the stratosphere that would stay there for about 10 years. The high stratospheric temperatures produced by soot absorbing solar radiation would create near-global ozone hole conditions even for a regional nuclear conflict.

A sufficiently powerful geomagnetic storm could result in the sudden absence of access to electricity in large areas of the world. Because industrial farming is increasingly dependent on constant access to electricity, for example in precision livestock farming, a geomagnetic storm could potentially have devastating effects on food production.

The World Food Programme has stated that pandemics such as the COVID-19 pandemic risk undermining the efforts of humanitarian and food security organizations to maintain food security. The International Food Policy Research Institute expressed concerns that the increased connections between markets and the complexity of food and economic systems could cause disruptions to food systems during the COVID-19 pandemic, specifically affecting the poor. The Ebola outbreak in 2014 led to increases in the prices of staple foods in West Africa.

Agricultural subsidies in the United States

Agricultural subsidies are paid to farmers and agribusinesses to supplement their income, manage the supply of their commodities and influence the cost and supply of those commodities. In the United States, the main crops the government subsidizes contribute to the obesity problem; since 1995, $300 billion has gone to crops that are used to create junk food.

Taxpayers heavily subsidize corn and soy, which are primary ingredients in processed foods and fatty foods not encouraged by the government, and are also used to fatten livestock.  Half of the farmland is devoted to corn and soy, and the rest is wheat. Soy and corn can be found in sweeteners like high fructose corn syrup. Over $19 billion during the prior 18 years to 2013 was spent to incent farmers to grow the crops, raising the price of fruits and vegetables by about 40% and lowering the price of dairy and other animal products. Little land is used for fruit and vegetable farming.

Corn, a pillar of American agriculture for years, is now mainly used for ethanol, high fructose corn syrup and bio-based plastics. About 40 percent of corn is used for ethanol and 36% is used as animal feed. A tiny fraction of corn is used as a food source, and much of that fraction is used for high-fructose corn syrup, which is a main ingredient in processed, unhealthy junk food.

People who ate the most subsidized food had a 37% higher risk of being obese compared to people who ate the least amount of subsidized food.  This brings up the concern that minority communities are more prone to risks of obesity due to financial limitations.  The subsidies result in those commodities being cheap to the public, compared to those recommended by dietary guidelines.

U.S. President Donald Trump proposed a 21% cut to government discretionary spending in the agriculture sector, which has met partisan resistance. This budget proposal would also reduce spending on the Special Supplement Nutrition Program for Women, Infants and Children, albeit less than President Obama did.

Children and food security

On April 29, 2008, a UNICEF UK report found that the world's poorest and most vulnerable children are being hit the hardest by climate change. The report, "Our Climate, Our Children, Our Responsibility: The Implications of Climate Change for the World's Children", says that access to clean water and food supplies will become more difficult, particularly in Africa and Asia.

In the United States
By way of comparison, in one of the largest food producing countries in the world, the United States, approximately one out of six people are "food insecure", including 17 million children, according to the U.S. Department of Agriculture in 2009.  A 2012 study in the Journal of Applied Research on Children found that rates of food security varied significantly by race, class and education. In both kindergarten and third grade, 8% of the children were classified as food insecure, but only 5% of white children were food insecure, while 12% and 15% of black and Hispanic children were food insecure, respectively. In third grade, 13% of black and 11% of Hispanic children were food insecure compared to 5% of white children.

There are also regional variations in food security. Although food insecurity can be difficult to measure, 45% of elementary and secondary students in Maine qualify for free or reduced-price school lunch; by some measures Maine has been declared the most food-insecure of the New England states. Transportation challenges and distance are common barriers to families in rural areas who seek food assistance. Social stigma is another important consideration, and for children, sensitively administering in-school programs can make the difference between success and failure. For instance, when John Woods, co-founder of Full Plates, Full Potential, learned that embarrassed students were shying away from the free breakfasts being distributed at a school he was working with, he made arrangements to provide breakfast free of charge to all of the students there.

According to a 2015 Congressional Budget Office report on child nutrition programs, it is more likely that food-insecure children will participate in school nutrition programs than children from food-secure families. School nutrition programs, such as the National School Lunch Program (NSLP) and the School Breakfast Program (SBP) have provided millions of children access to healthier lunch and breakfast meals, since their inception in the mid-1900s. According to the Centers for Disease Control and Prevention, NSLP has served over 300 million, while SBP has served about 10 million students each day. Nevertheless, far too many qualifying students still fail to receive these benefits simply due to not submitting the necessary paperwork. Multiple studies have reported that school nutrition programs play an important role in ensuring students are accessing healthy meals. Students who ate school lunches provided by NLSP showed higher diet quality than if they had their lunches. Even more, the USDA improved standards for school meals, which ultimately led to positive impacts on children's food selection and eating habits.

Countless partnerships have emerged in the quest for food security. A number of federal nutrition programs exist to provide food specifically for children, including the Summer Food Service Program, Special Milk Program (SMP) and Child and Adult Care Food Program (CACFP), and community and state organizations often network with these programs. The Summer Food Program in Bangor, Maine, is run by the Bangor Housing Authority and sponsored by Good Shepherd Food Bank. In turn, Waterville Maine's Thomas College, for example, is among the organizations holding food drives to collect donations for Good Shepherd. Children whose families qualify for Supplemental Nutrition Assistance Program (SNAP) or Women, Infants, and Children (WIC) may also receive food assistance. WIC alone served approximately 7.6 million participants, 75% of which are children and infants.

Despite the sizable populations served by these programs, Conservatives have regularly targeted these programs for defunding. Conservatives' arguments against school nutrition programs include fear of wasting food and fraud from applications. On January 23, 2017, H.R.610 was introduced to the House by Republican Representative Steve King. The bill seeks to repeal a rule set by the Food and Nutrition Service of the Department of Agriculture, which mandates schools to provide more nutritious and diverse foods across the food plate. Two months later, the Trump administration released a preliminary 2018 budget that proposed a $2 billion cut from WIC.

Food insecurity in children can lead to developmental impairments and long term consequences such as weakened physical, intellectual and emotional development.

Food insecurity is also related to obesity for people living in - "food deserts" - neighborhoods where nutritious foods are unavailable or unaffordable. People living in these neighborhoods often have to turn to more accessible but less nutritious food which puts them at greater risk of health issues like obesity, diabetes and heart disease.

Gender and food security

Gender inequality both leads to and is a result of food insecurity. According to estimates, girls and women make up 60% of the world's chronically hungry and little progress has been made in ensuring the equal right to food for women enshrined in the Convention on the Elimination of All Forms of Discrimination against Women.

At the global level, the gender gap in the prevalence of moderate or severe food insecurity grew even larger in the year of COVID-19 pandemic. The 2021 SOFI report finds that in 2019 an estimated 29.9 percent of women aged between 15 and 49 years around the world were affected by anemia – now a Sustainable Development Goal (SDG) Indicator (2.2.3).

Hunger correlates with discrimination both in education and employment opportunities and within the household, where women's bargaining power is lower. Women's employment is essential for not only advancing gender equality within the workforce but ensuring a sustainable future as it means less pressure for high birth rates and net migration. On the other hand, gender equality and the promotion of women's empowerment and gender transformative approaches are described as instrumental and critical to ending malnutrition and hunger and hence to achieve healthy diets and food security.

Women tend to be responsible for food preparation and childcare within the family and are more likely to spend their income on food and their children's needs. Women also play an important role in food production, processing, distribution and marketing. They often work as unpaid family workers, are involved in subsistence farming and represent about 43% of the agricultural labor force in developing countries, varying from 20% in Latin America to 50% in Eastern and Southeastern Asia and Sub-Saharan Africa. However, women face discrimination in access to land, credit, technologies, finance and other services. Empirical studies suggest that if women had the same access to productive resources as men, women could boost their yields by 20–30%, raising the overall agricultural output in developing countries by 2.5 to 4%. While these are rough estimates, there would be a significant benefit in closing the gender gap in agricultural productivity. The gendered aspects of food security are visible along the four pillars of food security: availability, access, utilization and stability, as defined by the Food and Agriculture Organization.

Women play key roles in maintaining all four pillars of food security: as food producers and agricultural entrepreneurs; as decision-makers for the food and nutritional security of their households and communities and as "managers" of the stability of food supplies in times of economic hardship. And yet, women's contributions often remain invisible and undervalued, inadequately reflected in policy, legal and institutional frameworks, and neglected by service providers and other actors operating across agrifood systems, thereby preventing them from reaching their full potential.

The number of people affected by hunger remains extremely high, with a significant impact on girls and women. There is a sentiment that making this trend disappear should be a top priority for governments and international institutions. This is because food insecurity is an issue concerning equality, rights and social justice. Factors like capitalism, and exploration of Indigenous lands all contribute to food insecurity for minorities and the people who are the most oppressed in various countries (women being one of these oppressed groups). Because girls and women are the most oppressed by the inequitable global economic processes that govern food systems and by global trends such as climate change, it is reflective of how institutions continue to place women in positions of disadvantage and impoverishment to make money and thrive on capitalizing the food system. When the government withholds food by raising its prices to amounts only privileged people can afford, they both benefit and can control the lower-class/marginalized people via the food market.

Use of genetically modified (GM) crops
One of the most up-and-coming techniques to ensure global food security is the use of genetically modified (GM) crops. The genome of these crops can be altered to address one or more aspects of the plant that may be preventing it from being grown in various regions under certain conditions. Many of these alterations can address the challenges that were previously mentioned above, including the water crisis, land degradation, and the ever-changing climate.

In agriculture and animal husbandry, the Green Revolution popularized the use of conventional hybridization to increase yield by creating high-yielding varieties. Often, the handful of hybridized breeds originated in developed countries and was further hybridized with local varieties in the rest of the developing world to create high-yield strains resistant to local climate and diseases.

The area sown to genetically engineered crops in developing countries is rapidly catching up with the area sown in industrial nations. According to the International Service for the Acquisition of Agri-biotech Applications (ISAAA), GM crops were grown by approximately 8.5 million farmers in 21 countries in 2005; up from 8.25 million farmers in 17 countries in 2004.

Opposition to GM crops
Some scientists question the safety of biotechnology as a panacea; agroecologists Miguel Altieri and Peter Rosset have enumerated ten reasons why biotechnology will not ensure food security, protect the environment, or reduce poverty. Reasons include:
 There is no relationship between the prevalence of hunger in a given country and its population
 Most innovations in agricultural biotechnology have been profit-driven rather than need-driven
 Ecological theory predicts that the large-scale landscape homogenization with transgenic crops will exacerbate the ecological problems already associated with monoculture agriculture
 And, that much of the needed food can be produced by small farmers located throughout the world using existing agroecological technologies.

Based on evidence from previous attempts, there is a likely lack of transferability of one type of GM crop from one region to another. For example, modified crops that have proven successful in Asia from the Green Revolution have failed when tried in regions of Africa. More research must be done regarding the specific requirements of growing a specific crop in a specific region.

There is also a drastic lack of education given to governments, farmers, and the community about the science behind GM crops, as well as suitable growing practices. In most relief programs, farmers are given seeds with little explanation and little attention is paid to the resources available to them or even laws that prohibit them from distributing produce. Governments are often not advised on the economic and health implications that come with growing GM crops and are then left to make judgments on their own. Because they have so little information regarding these crops, they usually shy away from allowing them or do not take the time and effort required to regulate their use. Members of the community that will then consume the produce from these crops are also left in the dark about what these modifications mean and are often scared off by their 'unnatural' origins. This has resulted in failure to properly grow crops as well as strong opposition to the unknown practices.

A study published in June 2016 evaluated the status of the implementation of Golden Rice, which was first developed in the 1990s to produce higher levels of Vitamin A than its non-GMO counterparts. This strain of rice was designed so that malnourished women and children in third-world countries who were more susceptible to deficiencies could easily improve their Vitamin A intake levels and prevent blindness, which is a common result. Golden Rice production was centralized in the Philippines, yet there have been many hurdles to jump in order to get production moving. The study showed that the project is far behind schedule and is not living up to its expectations. Although research on Golden Rice  continues, the country has moved forward with other non-GMO initiatives to address the Vitamin A deficiency problem that is so pervasive in that region.

Many anti-GMO activists argue that the use of GM crops decreases biodiversity among plants. Livestock biodiversity is also threatened by the modernization of agriculture and the focus on more productive major breeds. Therefore, efforts have been made by governments and non-governmental organizations to conserve livestock biodiversity through strategies such as cryoconservation of animal genetic resources.Cryoconservation of Animal Genetic Resources.Rep. Rome: Food and Agriculture Organization of the United Nations, 2012. FAO Animal Production and Health Guidelines No. 12. Print.

Support of GM crops
Many GM crop success stories exist, primarily in developed nations like the US, China, and various countries in Europe. Common GM crops include cotton, maize, and soybeans, all of which are grown throughout North and South America as well as regions of Asia. Modified cotton crops, for example, have been altered such that they are resistant to pests, can be grown in more extreme heat, cold, or drought, and produce longer, stronger fibers to be used in textile production.

One of the biggest threats to rice, which is a staple food crop especially in India and other countries within Asia, is blast disease, which is a fungal infection that causes lesions to form on all parts of the plant. A genetically engineered strain of rice has been developed so that it is resistant to blast, greatly improving the crop yield of farmers and allowing rice to be more accessible to everyone. Some other crops have been modified such that they produce higher yields per plant or that they require less land for growing. The latter can be helpful in extreme climates with little arable land and also decreases deforestation, as fewer trees need to be cut down in order to make room for crop fields. Others yet have been altered such that they do not require the use of insecticides or fungicides. This addresses various health concerns associated with such pesticides and can also work to improve biodiversity within the area in which these crops are grown.

In a review of Borlaug's 2000 publication entitled Ending world hunger: the promise of biotechnology and the threat of antiscience zealotry, the authors argued that Borlaug's warnings were still true in 2010,Research conducted by the GMO Risk Assessment and Communication of Evidence (GRACE) program through the EU between 2007 and 2013 focused on many uses of GM crops and evaluated many facets of their effects on human, animal, and environmental health.

The body of scientific evidence concluding that GM foods are safe to eat and do not pose environmental risks is wide. Findings from the International Council of Scientists (2003) that analyzed a selection of approximately 50 science-based reviews concluded that "currently available genetically modified foods are safe to eat," and "there is no evidence of any deleterious environmental effects having occurred from the trait/species combinations currently available." The United Nations Food and Agriculture Organization (FAO) supported the same consensus a year later in addition to recommending the extension of biotechnology to the developing world. Similarly, the Royal Society (2003) and British Medical Association (2004) found no adverse health effects of consuming genetically modified foods.British Medical Association, Board of Science and Education, "Genetically modified foods and health: a second interim statement," British Medical Association, May 2004. These findings supported the conclusions of earlier studies by the European Union Research Directorate, a compendium of 81 scientific studies conducted by more than 400 research teams did not show "any new risks to human health or the environment, beyond the usual uncertainties of conventional plant breeding." Likewise, the Organization for Economic Cooperation and Development in Europe (OECD) and the Nuffield Council on Bioethics (1999) did not find that genetically modified foods posed a health risk.Millstone, E., and J. Abraham. 1988. Additives: A guide for everyone. London: Penguin. Nuffield Council on Bioethics "Genetically modified crops: the ethical and social issues," 1999.

Approaches

By the United Nations
The UN Millennium Development Goals are one of the initiatives aimed at achieving food security in the world. The first Millennium Development Goal states that the UN "is to eradicate extreme hunger and poverty" by 2015. Olivier De Schutter, the UN Special Rapporteur on the Right to Food, advocates for a multidimensional approach to food security challenges. This approach emphasizes the physical availability of food; the social, economic and physical access people have to food; and the nutrition, safety and cultural appropriateness or adequacy of food.

The work of the Food and Agriculture Organization
Over the last decade, FAO has proposed a "twin track" approach to fight food insecurity that combines sustainable development and short-term hunger relief. Development approaches include investing in rural markets and rural infrastructure. In general, FAO proposes the use of public policies and programs that promote long-term economic growth that will benefit the poor. To obtain short-term food security, vouchers for seeds, fertilizer, or access to services could promote agricultural production. The use of conditional or unconditional food or cash transfers is another approach promoted by FAO. Conditional transfers may include school feeding programs, while unconditional transfers could include general food distribution, emergency food aid or cash transfers. A third approach is the use of subsidies as safety nets to increase the purchasing power of households. FAO has stated that "approaches should be human rights-based, target the poor, promote gender equality, enhance long-term resilience and allow sustainable graduation out of poverty."

FAO has noted that some countries have been successful in fighting food insecurity and decreasing the number of people suffering from undernourishment. Bangladesh is an example of a country that has met the Millennium Development Goal hunger target. The FAO credited growth in agricultural productivity and macroeconomic stability for the rapid economic growth in the 1990s that resulted in an increase in food security. Irrigation systems were established through infrastructure development programs. Two programs, HarvestPlus and the Golden Rice Project, provided biofortified crops in order to decrease micronutrient deficiencies.

In 2020, FAO deployed intense advocacy to make healthy diets affordable as a way to reduce global food insecurity and save vast sums in the process. The agency said that if healthy diets were to become the norm, almost all of the health costs that can currently be blamed on unhealthy diets (estimated to reach US$1.3 trillion a year in 2030) could be offset; and that on the social costs of greenhouse gas emissions that are linked to unhealthy diets, the savings would be even greater (US$1.7 trillion, or over 70 percent of the total estimated for 2030).

FAO urged governments to make nutrition a central plank of their agricultural policies, investment policies and social protection systems. It also called for measures to tackle food loss and waste, and to lower costs at every stage of food production, storage, transport, distribution and marketing. Another FAO priority is for governments to secure better access to markets for small-scale producers of nutritious foods.

By the World Food Programme

The World Food Programme (WFP) is an agency of the United Nations that uses food aid to promote food security and eradicate hunger and poverty. In particular, the WFP provides food aid to refugees and to others experiencing food emergencies. It also seeks to improve nutrition and quality of life to the most vulnerable populations and promote self-reliance. An example of a WFP program is the "Food For Assets" program in which participants work on new infrastructure, or learn new skills, that will increase food security, in exchange for food. The WFP and the Government of Kenya have partnered in the Food For Assets program in hopes of increasing the resilience of communities to shocks.

Global partnerships to achieve food security and end hunger
In April 2012, the Food Assistance Convention was signed, the world's first legally binding international agreement on food aid. The May 2012 Copenhagen Consensus recommended that efforts to combat hunger and malnutrition should be the first priority for politicians and private sector philanthropists looking to maximize the effectiveness of aid spending. They put this ahead of other priorities, like the fight against malaria and AIDS.

The main global policy to reduce hunger and poverty are the recently approved Sustainable Development Goals. In particular Goal 2: Zero Hunger sets globally agreed targets to end hunger, achieve food security and improved nutrition and promote sustainable agriculture by 2030. A number of organizations have formed initiatives with the more ambitious goal to achieve this outcome in only 10 years, by 2025:
 In 2013 Caritas International started a Caritas-wide initiative aimed at ending systemic hunger by 2025. The One human family, food for all campaign focuses on awareness raising, improving the effect of Caritas programs and advocating the implementation of the Right to Food.
 The partnership Compact2025, led by IFPRI with the involvement of UN organisations, NGOs and private foundations develops and disseminates evidence-based advice to politicians and other decision-makers aimed at ending hunger and undernutrition in the coming 10 years, by 2025. It bases its claim that hunger can be ended by 2025 on a report by Shenggen Fan and Paul Polman that analyzed the experiences from China, Vietnam, Brazil and Thailand and concludes that eliminating hunger and undernutrition was possible by 2025.
 In June 2015, the European Union and the Bill & Melinda Gates Foundation have launched a partnership to combat undernutrition especially in children. The program will initially be implemented in Bangladesh, Burundi, Ethiopia, Kenya, Laos and Niger and will help these countries to improve information and analysis about nutrition so they can develop effective national nutrition policies.
 The Food and Agriculture Organization of the UN has created a partnership that will act through the African Union's CAADP framework aiming to end hunger in Africa by 2025. It includes different interventions including support for improved food production, a strengthening of social protection and integration of the Right to Food into national legislation.

By the United States Agency for International Development
The United States Agency for International Development (USAID) proposes several key steps to increasing agricultural productivity, which is in turn key to increasing rural income and reducing food insecurity. They include:
 Boosting agricultural science and technology. Current agricultural yields are insufficient to feed the growing populations. Eventually, the rising agricultural productivity drives economic growth.
 Securing property rights and access to finance
 Enhancing human capital through education and improved health
 Conflict prevention and resolution mechanisms and democracy and governance based on principles of accountability and transparency in public institutions and the rule of law are basic to reducing vulnerable members of society.

Since the 1960s, the U.S. has been implementing a food stamp program (now called the Supplemental Nutrition Assistance Program) to directly target consumers who lack the income to purchase food. According to Tim Josling, a Senior Fellow at the Freeman Spogli Institute for International Studies, Stanford University, food stamps or other methods of distribution of purchasing power directly to consumers might fit into the range of international programs under consideration to tackle food insecurity.

 Agrifood systems resilience 
According to FAO, resilient agrifood systems achieve food security. The resilience of agrifood systems refers to the capacity over time of agrifood systems, in the face of any disruption, to sustainably ensure availability of and access to sufficient, safe and nutritious food for all, and sustain the livelihoods of agrifood systems' actors. Truly resilient agrifood systems must have a robust capacity to prevent, anticipate, absorb, adapt and transform in the face of any disruption, with the functional goal of ensuring food security and nutrition for all and decent livelihoods and incomes for agrifood systems' actors. Such resilience addresses all dimensions of food security, but focuses specifically on stability of access and sustainability, which ensure food security in both the short and the long term. Resilience-building involves preparing for disruptions, particularly those that cannot be anticipated, in particular through: diversity in domestic production, in imports, and in supply chains; robust food transport networks; and guaranteed continued access to food for all.

The FAO finds that, depending on context, there are six pathways to follow towards food systems transformation: integrating humanitarian, development and peacebuilding policies in conflict-affected areas; scaling up climate resilience across food systems; strengthening resilience of the most vulnerable to economic adversity; intervening along the food supply chains to lower the cost of nutritious foods; tackling poverty and structural inequalities, ensuring interventions are pro-poor and inclusive; and strengthening food environments and changing consumer behaviour to promote dietary patterns with positive impacts on human health and the environment.

Given that most food systems are affected by more than one driver, the formulation of comprehensive portfolios of policies, investments and legislation may be elaborated along several pathways simultaneously. This will allow for maximizing their combined effects on food systems transformation, exploiting win-win solutions and mitigating undesirable trade-offs.

Coherence in the formulation and implementation of policies and investments among food, health, social protection and environmental systems is also essential to build on synergies towards more efficient and effective food systems solutions.

Systems approaches are needed to build coherent portfolios of policies, investments and legislation and enable win-win solutions while managing trade-offs, including territorial approaches, ecosystems approaches, Indigenous Peoples’ food systems approaches and interventions that systemically address protracted crisis conditions.

Improving agricultural productivity to benefit the rural poor

There are strong, direct relationships between agricultural productivity, hunger, poverty, and sustainability. Three-quarters of the world's poor live in rural areas and make their living from agriculture. Hunger and child malnutrition are greater in these areas than in urban areas. Moreover, the higher the proportion of the rural population that obtains its income solely from subsistence farming (without the benefit of pro-poor technologies and access to markets), the higher the incidence of malnutrition. Therefore, improvements in agricultural productivity aimed at small-scale farmers will benefit the rural poor first. Food and feed crop demand is likely to double in the next 50 years, as the global population approaches nine billion. Growing sufficient food will require people to make changes such as increasing productivity in areas dependent on rainfed agriculture; improving soil fertility management; expanding cropped areas; investing in irrigation; conducting agricultural trade between countries; and reducing gross food demand by influencing diets and reducing post-harvest losses.

According to the Comprehensive Assessment of Water Management in Agriculture, a major study led by the International Water Management Institute (IWMI), managing rainwater and soil moisture more effectively, and using supplemental and small-scale irrigation, hold the key to helping the greatest number of poor people. It has called for a new era of water investments and policies for upgrading rainfed agriculture that would go beyond controlling field-level soil and water to bring new freshwater sources through better local management of rainfall and runoff. Increased agricultural productivity enables farmers to grow more food, which translates into better diets and, under market conditions that offer a level playing field, into higher farm incomes. With more money, farmers are more likely to diversify production and grow higher-value crops, benefiting not only themselves but the economy as a whole.

It may be that an alliance between the emergency food program and community-supported agriculture is beneficial, as some countries' food stamps cannot be used at farmer's markets and places where food is less processed and grown locally.
The gathering of wild food plants appears to be an efficient alternative method of subsistence in tropical countries, which may play a role in poverty alleviation.

Large-scale food stockpiling
The minimum annual global wheat storage is approximately two months. To counteract the severe food security issues caused by global catastrophic risks, years of food storage has been proposed. Though this could ameliorate smaller scale problems like regional conflict and drought, it would exacerbate current food insecurity by raising food prices.

Alternative diets
Food security could be increased by integrating alternative foods that can be grown in compact environments, that are resilient to pests and disease, and that don't require complex supply chains. Foods meeting these criteria include algae, mealworm, and fungi-derived mycoprotein. While unpalatable on their own to most people, such raw ingredients might be processed into more palatable foods. Some such foods might also be feasible following a nuclear winter or similar loss of sunlight, as might seaweed, as well as various single-cell proteins that can feed on dead leaves, grass, or methane.

Agricultural insurance
Insurance is a contractual means of protection from financial loss, which allows exposed individuals to pool resources to spread their risk. They do so by contributing premium to an insurance fund, which will indemnify those who suffer insured loss. This procedure reduces the risk for an individual by spreading his/her risk among the multiple fund contributors. Insurance can be designed to protect many types of individuals and assets against single or multiple perils and buffer insured parties against sudden and dramatic income or asset loss.

Crop insurance is purchased by agricultural producers to protect themselves against either the loss of their crops due to natural disasters. Two type of insurances are available: claim-based insurances and index-based insurances. In particular, in poor countries facing food security problems, index-based insurances offer some advantages, including indices that can be derived from globally available satellite images that correlate well with what is insured. These indices can be delivered at low cost, and the insurance products open up new markets that are not served by claim-based insurances.

An advantage of index-based insurance is that it can potentially be delivered at lower cost. A significant barrier that hinders uptake of claim-based insurance is the high transaction cost for searching for prospective policyholders, negotiating and administering contracts, verifying losses and determining payouts. Index insurance eliminates the loss verification step, thereby mitigating a significant transaction cost. A second advantage of index-based insurance is that, because it pays an indemnity based on the reading of an index rather than individual losses, it eliminates much of the fraud, moral hazard and adverse selection, which are common in classical claim-based insurance. A further advantage of index insurance is that payments based on a standardized and indisputable index also allow for a fast indemnity payment. The indemnity payment could be automated, further reducing transaction costs.

Basis risk is a major disadvantage of index-based insurance. It is the situation where an individual experiences a loss without receiving payment or vice versa. Basis risk is a direct result of the strength of the relation between the index that estimates the average loss by the insured group and the loss of insured assets by an individual. The weaker this relation the higher the basis risk. High basis risk undermines the willingness of potential clients to purchase insurance. It thus challenges insurance companies to design insurances such as to minimize basis risk.

Food Justice Movement

The Food Justice Movement has been seen as a unique and multifaceted movement with relevance to the issue of food security. It has been described as a movement about social-economic and political problems in connection to environmental justice, improved nutrition and health, and activism. Today, a growing number of individuals and minority groups are embracing the Food Justice due to the perceived increase in hunger within nations such as the United States as well as the amplified effect of food insecurity on many minority communities, particularly the Black and Latino communities.

A number of organizations have either championed the Food Justice Cause or greatly impacted the Food Justice space. An example of a prominent organization within the food justice movement has been the Coalition of Immokalee Workers, which is a worker-based human rights organization that has been recognized globally for its accomplishments in the areas of human trafficking, social responsibility and gender-based violence at work. The Coalition of Immoaklee Workers most prominent accomplishment related to the food justice space has been its part in implementing the Fair Food Program, which increased the pay and bettered working conditions of farm workers in the tomato industry who had been exploited for generations. This accomplishment provided over 30,000 workers more income and the ability to access better and more healthy foods for themselves and their families. Another organization in the food justice space is the Fair Food Network, an organization that has embraced the mission of helping families who need healthy food gain access to it while also increasing the livelihood for farmers in America and growing local economies. Started by Oran B. Hesterma, the Fair Food Network has invested over $200 million in various projects and initiatives, such as the Double Up Food Bucks program, to help low-income and minority communities access healthier food. A possible way to learn about nutrition, and provide community activities and access to food is community gardening.

 Food Sovereignty 
The concept of “food sovereignty” is important within food justice movements in the US. "Food sovereignty" is a response to a history of colonialism, power, and industrialization. Its main goal is to raise awareness of, “the right of peoples to healthy and culturally appropriate food produced through ecologically sound and sustainable methods, and their right to define their own food and agriculture systems”. The term “sovereign” can be understood as independence, self governance, or a non-alignment - in the context of the Western world, this is seen as autonomy from the global food industry. Because the industrialization of food has caused a lack of agency over food source, Food sovereignty declares the business practices of multinational corporations as a form of neocolonialism. For this reason, the food sovereignty movement is in direct opposition with multinational corporations. This oppositional relationship between people and the food industry has birthed the Food Justice Movement, a conversation that food sovereignty is apart of. 

“The food justice movement is a different approach to a community’s needs that seeks to truly advance self-reliance and social justice by placing communities in leadership of their own solutions". This movement is a direct challenge to colonial food pathways, as it calls attention to the need for self reliance to determine how food is grown and consumed.  

Food security related days
October 16 has been chosen as World Food Day, in honour of the date FAO was founded in 1945. On this day, FAO hosts a variety of events at its headquarters in Rome and around the world, as well as seminars with UN officials.

The United Nations, on the joint initiative of FAO and Slovenia, has designated 20 May as World Bee Day to highlight the threats facing pollinators. Bees and other pollinating insects help sustain food security by contributing to a variety of crops, and are estimated to improve the food output of some 2 billion small farmers.

 Model 
An example of a city that has overcome challenges and achieved improved sustainability practices while immensely decreasing food insecurity is Lisbon. Lisbon, the capital of Portugal, was awarded as the 2020 European Green Leaf Award Winner for its notable sustainable land use, transport, green growth and eco and waste innovations. The 2010 to 2014 Portuguese financial crisis, a prominent obstacle for Portugal caused by factors such as the global recession, resulted in increased unemployment rates and reduced household budgets. As a product, adequate food intake was evidently inhibited. However, Lisbon demonstrated that sustainability and economic growth can go hand in hand. Measures were taken place such as the ReFood Movement, a food waste prevention initiative, and the Municipal Plan Against Food Wastage program.

Generalization
, the concept of food security has mostly focused on food calories rather than the quality and nutrition of food. The concept of nutrition security or nutritional security evolved as a broader concept. In 1995, it has been defined as "adequate nutritional status in terms of protein, energy, vitamins, and minerals for all household members at all times".
It is also related to the concepts of nutrition education and nutritional deficiency.

See also

 Agricultural economics
 Allotment gardens
 Cryoconservation of animal genetic resources
 Food price crisis
 Food rescue
 Food Security Bill
 Food speculation
 Food vs. feed
 Garden sharing
 Geography of food
 Human security
 Indian Famine Codes
 Integrated Food Security Phase Classification
 International Assessment of Agricultural Science and Technology for Development
 List of diets
 List of food banks
 List of food labeling regulations
 Malawian food crisis
 Malthusian catastrophe
 Nutritional economics
 Peak wheat
 School feeding in low-income countries
 Subsistence crisis
 Survivalism
 Theories of famines
 Virtual water
 World Agricultural Supply and Demand EstimatesOrganizations:'''

 Afrique verte
 Community Food Security Coalition
 Consultative Group on International Agricultural Research
 Famine Early Warning Systems Network
 Food First
 Global Crop Diversity Trust
 Grain From Ukraine
 Local Food Plus
 WorldVeg

 Sources 

References

Sources
 Cox, P. G., S. Mak, G. C. Jahn, and S. Mot. 2001. Impact of technologies on food security and poverty alleviation in Cambodia: designing research processes. pp. 677–684 In S. Peng and B. Hardy [eds.] "Rice Research for Food Security and Poverty Alleviation." Proceeding the International Rice Research Conference, March 31, – April 3, 2000, Los Baños, Phile.
 Singer, H. W. (1997). A global view of food security. Agriculture + Rural Development, 4: 3–6. Technical Center for Agricultural and Rural Development (CTA).

Further reading
 Dixant, Agriculture, and Food Security in Southern Africa edited by Steven Were Omamo and Klaus von Grebmer (2005) (Brief and Book available)
 
 
 Introduction to the Basic Concepts of Food Security  EC-FAO Food Security Programme (2008) Practical Guide Series
 Lindberg R, Whelan J, Lawrence M, Gold L, Friel S (February 2015) "Still serving hot soup? Two hundred years of a charitable food sector in Australia: a narrative review". Australia New Zealand Journal of Public Health.
 The environmental food crisis A study done by the UN on feeding the world population (2009).
 Climate change: Impact on agriculture and costs of adaptation A report by the International Food Policy Research Institute that presents research results that quantify the impacts of climate change, assesses the consequences for food security, and estimates the investments that would offset the negative consequences for human well-being.
 Moseley, W.G. and B.I. Logan. 2005. "Food Security." In: Wisner, B., C. Toulmin and R. Chitiga (eds). Toward a New Map of Africa. London: Earthscan Publications. Pp. 133–152.
 
 Food Insecurity, a special issue on the topic by the Journal of Applied Research on Children''. (212)
 Achieving Food and Nutrition Security: Actions to Meet the Global Challenge. A Training Course Reader by InWEnt, GTZ and Welthungerhilfe. 3rd edition, 240 pages, 2009
 Research from the Global Sustainability Institute that studies the link between political fragility and access to food

External links

 Food Security Communications Toolkit from FAO
 
 
 
  Published in Issue No. 125, page 39 to 40 - (5802) characters

 

Famines
Urban agriculture
Food and the environment
Articles containing video clips
Effects of climate change